Sheridan County is a county located in the U.S. state of North Dakota. As of the 2020 census, the population was 1,265, making it the third-least populous county in North Dakota. Its county seat is McClusky.

History
The Dakota Territory legislature created the county on January 4, 1873, naming it for Civil War General Philip Henry Sheridan. The county organization was not completed at that time, but the new county was not attached to another county for administrative or judicial purposes. In 1883 and again in 1887, the county boundaries were reduced, and on November 8, 1892, the county was dissolved, its remaining territory assigned to McLean. This lasted until the November 3, 1908 election, when McLean County voters chose to partition off the eastern portion of that unit into a new county, although the new boundaries were somewhat different from the former Sheridan. The new county government was effected on December 24 of that year.

Sheridan has been severely affected by out-migration; its population collapsed from 7,373 in 1930 to 1,321 by 2010. Its population decline of 38.4% from 1990 to 2016 was the highest among all North Dakota counties.

Geography
The terrain of Sheridan County consists of dry rolling hills, dotted with lakes and ponds. The area is largely devoted to agriculture. The terrain slopes to the north and east, with its highest point on the eastern part of its southern boundary at 2,034' (620m) ASL.

Major highways

  U.S. Highway 52
  North Dakota Highway 14
  North Dakota Highway 53
  North Dakota Highway 200

Adjacent counties

 McHenry County - north
 Pierce County - northeast
 Wells County - east
 Kidder County - southeast
 Burleigh County - south
 McLean County - west

National protected area
 Sheyenne Lake National Wildlife Refuge

Lakes

 Bentz Lake
 Cherry Lake
 Coal Mine Lake
 Ebel Lake
 Guyes Lake
 Heckers Lake
 Kandt Lake
 Krueger Lake
 Lake Richard (part)
 Lone Tree Lake
 Moesner Lake
 Pelican Lake (part)
 Postel Lake
 Salt Lake (part)
 Sand Lake
 Sheyenne Lake

Demographics

2000 census
As of the 2000 census, there were 1,710 people, 731 households, and 515 families in the county. The population density was 1.76/sqmi (0.68/km2). There were 924 housing units at an average density of 0.95/sqmi (0.37/km2). The racial makeup of the county was 99.24% White, 0.12% Black or African American, 0.41% Native American, 0.06% from other races, and 0.18% from two or more races. 0.35% of the population were Hispanic or Latino of any race. 72.3% were of German and 12.5% Norwegian ancestry.

There were 731 households, out of which 25.00% had children under the age of 18 living with them, 62.80% were married couples living together, 4.40% had a female householder with no husband present, and 29.50% were non-families. 27.50% of all households were made up of individuals, and 16.70% had someone living alone who was 65 years of age or older.  The average household size was 2.31 and the average family size was 2.80.

The county population contained 21.40% under the age of 18, 3.80% from 18 to 24, 19.90% from 25 to 44, 28.30% from 45 to 64, and 26.60% who were 65 years of age or older. The median age was 48 years. For every 100 females there were 105.80 males. For every 100 females age 18 and over, there were 104.30 males.

The median income for a household in the county was $24,450, and the median income for a family was $30,156. Males had a median income of $21,094 versus $14,327 for females. The per capita income for the county was $13,283. About 16.00% of families and 21.00% of the population were below the poverty line, including 24.90% of those under age 18 and 18.30% of those age 65 or over.

2010 census
As of the 2010 census, there were 1,321 people, 645 households, and 417 families in the county. The population density was 1.36/sqmi (0.52/km2). There were 894 housing units at an average density of 0.92/sqmi (0.36/km2). The racial makeup of the county was 96.7% white, 1.1% American Indian, 0.3% black or African American, 0.2% Pacific islander, 0.2% Asian, 0.4% from other races, and 1.2% from two or more races. Those of Hispanic or Latino origin made up 1.2% of the population. In terms of ancestry, 70.1% were German, 14.2% were Norwegian, 6.3% were English, 6.0% were Russian, and 1.8% were American.

Of the 645 households, 17.5% had children under the age of 18 living with them, 54.3% were married couples living together, 5.7% had a female householder with no husband present, 35.3% were non-families, and 33.0% of all households were made up of individuals. The average household size was 2.05 and the average family size was 2.55. The median age was 53.4 years.

The median income for a household in the county was $37,727 and the median income for a family was $43,906. Males had a median income of $30,833 versus $24,583 for females. The per capita income for the county was $24,286. About 15.0% of families and 18.9% of the population were below the poverty line, including 31.1% of those under age 18 and 19.7% of those age 65 or over.

Communities

Cities
 Goodrich
 Martin
 McClusky (county seat)

Census-designated place
 Denhoff

Unincorporated communities
 Lincoln Valley
 Pickardville

Townships

 Berlin
 Boone
 Denhoff
 Edgemont
 Fairview
 Goodrich
 Highland
 Lincoln Dale
 Martin
 Mauch
 McClusky
 Pickard
 Prophets
 Rosenfield

Defunct townships
 Holmes
 New Germantown

Politics
Sheridan County voters have been reliably Republican for decades. In no national election since 1936 has the county selected the Democratic Party candidate (as of 2020).

See also
 National Register of Historic Places listings in Sheridan County, North Dakota

References

External links

 Sheridan County official website
 Sheridan County GenWeb - Genealogy Links
 Sheridan County map, North Dakota DOT

 
1908 establishments in North Dakota
Populated places established in 1908